The men's individual competition at the 2002 Asian Games in Busan was held from 3 October to 6 October at the Asiad Country Club.

Schedule
All times are Korea Standard Time (UTC+09:00)

Results 
Legend
DNF — Did not finish
DNS — Did not start

References 

2002 Asian Games Official Report, Pages 420–421
Results

Golf at the 2002 Asian Games